Kyungdong University is a private University in northeastern South Korea. It has three campuses - metropol in Yangju City, medical in Wonju City and global in Goseong and Sokcho cities. About 245 instructors are employed. The current president is Seong-yong Chun (전성용).

Academics

Undergraduate offerings are provided through five divisions: Humanities and Social Science, Food Science, IT, Tourism, Health and Nursing, and Education, which are separated into 3 Special Campuses and 33 departments.

History

Its history can be traced back to 1981 when Sokcho Technical College (속초전문대학) was founded by Dr Chun Jae-wook. In 1983 it changed its name to Dong-U Technical College and in 1998 to Dong-U College. In 1997 Dr Chun founded a separate institution, Kyungdong University. In 2012 now-Ministry of Education granted merger of two institutions, Dong-U College and Kyungdong University, and the closure of Dong-U College.

See also
List of colleges and universities in South Korea
Education in South Korea

References

External links
Official Global website
Kyungdong University President
Official website,in Korean Only

Universities and colleges in Gangwon Province, South Korea
Sokcho
1996 establishments in South Korea
Educational institutions established in 1996